Jaroslav Satoranský (born December 17, 1939, Prague) is a Czech actor. He belongs to famous Czech stage players and also to film actors.

Biography 
Jaroslav Satoransky finished his study of DAMU in 1961. After this he performed in a Kladno Theatre for a short time. Since 1966 he has been a member of Vinohrady Theatre in Prague.

Selected filmography 
 2004 -  Vražda kočky domácí
 2004 -  Četnické humoresky
 2001 -  Zdivočelá země
 1998 -  Legenda Emöke
 1993 -  Ze života hmyzu
 1979 -  Inženýrská odysea
 1979 -  Causa Králík
 1978 -  Tajemství proutěného košíku
 1977 -  Sázka na třináctku
 1976 -  Případ mrtvých spolužáků
 1976 -  Parta hic
 1975 -  Youngest of the Hamr's Family
 1974 -  Krkonošské pohádky
 1974 -  Případ mrtvého muže
 1971 -  F. L. Věk
 1970 -  Už zase skáču přes kaluže
 1969 - End of a Priest
 1969 -  Záhada hlavolamu
 1969 -  Larks on a String
 1968 -  The Sinful People of Prague
 1967 -  Dívka s třemi velbloudy
 1963 -  Bylo nás deset
 1961 -  Kde řeky mají slunce
 1961 -  Osení

External links 
 DAMU - "Art University"
 Theatre in Vinohrady, Prague

Living people
1939 births
Czech male film actors
Czech male stage actors
Male actors from Prague
Academy of Performing Arts in Prague alumni
20th-century Czech male actors
21st-century Czech male actors
Recipients of the Thalia Award